Gaston Jules Louis Antoine Alibert (22 February 1878 in Paris – 26 December 1917 in Paris) was a French fencer and olympic champion in épée competition.

He received a gold medal in épée individual and a gold medal in épée team at the 1908 Summer Olympics in London. Eight years before, Alibert already participated in the 1900 Summer Olympics in Paris placing seventh in the épée individual event. He contracted tuberculosis while at the front in World War I and later died in 1917 aged 39.

References

External links
 

1878 births
1917 deaths
Fencers from Paris
French male épée fencers
Olympic fencers of France
Fencers at the 1900 Summer Olympics
Fencers at the 1908 Summer Olympics
Olympic gold medalists for France
Olympic medalists in fencing
Medalists at the 1908 Summer Olympics
French military personnel of World War I
20th-century deaths from tuberculosis
Tuberculosis deaths in France